Naysun Alae-Carew is a Scottish film producer and editor. He is best known for the film, Anna and the Apocalypse which was nominated for the Best Feature Film accolade at the 2018 British Academy Scotland Awards. The film was based on the short film Zombie Musical which earned him the Beat Producer: Short Form accolade at the 2011 British Academy Scotland New Talent Awards. He is a company director of Blazing Griffin which makes independent film and video games including the remastered version of The Ship.

Filmography

Awards and nominations

See also
Anna and the Apocalypse

References

External links

Scottish film editors
Scottish film producers
Year of birth missing (living people)
Living people